The 1989 FIFA World Youth Championship took place in Saudi Arabia between 16 February and 3 March 1989. The 1989 championship was the 7th contested. The tournament took place across four cities: Riyadh, Jeddah, Dammam, and Ta'if.

Qualification 

1.Teams that made their debut.
2.Replaced , who was disqualified from the tournament due to the Cachirules scandal.

Match officials

Africa
 Badara Sene
 Idrissa Sarr
 Neji Jouini

Asia
 Abdul Al Nasri
 Chen Shengcai
 Ahmed Mohammed Jassim

Europe 
 Hubert Forstinger
 Tullio Lanese
 Neil Midgley
 Egil Nervik
 Aron Schmidhuber
 Alan Snoddy
 Alexey Spirin
 Marcel van Langenhove

North, Central America and Caribbean
 Arturo Angeles
 Arturo Brizio Carter
 José Carlos Ortíz

South America
 Juan Antonio Bava
 Elias Jácome
 José Roberto Wright
 José Torres Cadena

Squads 
For a list of all squads that played in the final tournament, see 1989 FIFA World Youth Championship squads

Group stages 

The 16 teams were split into four groups of four teams.  Four group winners, and four second-place finishers qualify for the knockout round.

Group A

Group B

Group C

Group D

Knockout stages

Quarterfinals

Semifinals

Third place play-off

Final

Result

Awards

Goalscorers

Oleg Salenko of Soviet Union won the Golden Shoe award for scoring five goals. In total, 81 goals were scored by 55 different players, with none of them credited as own goal.

5 goals
 Oleg Salenko
3 goals
 Bismarck
 Marcelo Henrique
 Sonny Anderson
 Christopher Ohenhen
 Mutiu Adepoju
 Steve Snow
2 goals

 Ricardo França
 Wilson Muñoz
 Radoslav Látal
 Wali Kareem
 Jorge Couto
 Bakhva Tedeev
 Sergei Kiriakov
 Antonio Pinilla
 Abdul Latif Helou
 Troy Dayak

1 goal

 Diego Simeone
 Humberto Biazotti
 Martín Ubaldi
 Cássio
 Leonardo Araújo
 Diego Osorio
 Danilo Brenes
 Rónald González Brenes
 Henri Fuchs
 Stephan Prausse
 Uwe Jahnig
 Laith Hussein
 Naeem Saddam
 Radhi Shenaishil
 Christopher Nwosu
 Nduka Ugbade
 Samuel Elijah
 Bjørn Johansen
 Lars Bohinen
 Oystein Drillestad
 Oyvind Mellemstrand
 Kante Nfaly
 Abel Silva
 João Pinto
 Jorge Amaral
 Paulo Alves
 Hamad Al Debaikhi
 Khaled Al Harbi
 Khalid Al Rowaihi
 Saadoun Al Suraiti
 Andrei Timoshenko
 Oleg Matveev
 David Villabona
 Moisés García León
 Mohammad Afash
 Yasser Sibai
 Chris Henderson
 Dario Brose

Final ranking

Notes

External links
FIFA World Youth Championship Saudi Arabia 1989 , FIFA.com
RSSSF > FIFA World Youth Championship > 1989
FIFA Technical Report (Part 1), (Part 2), (Part 3) and (Part 4)

Fifa World Youth Championship, 1989
International association football competitions hosted by Saudi Arabia
FIFA World Youth Championship
Fifa World Youth Championship, 1989
February 1989 sports events in Asia
March 1989 sports events in Asia